Alissa in Concert  is a 1990 Dutch musical film directed by Erik van Zuylen.

Cast

Frances-Marie Uitti - Alissa
Michael Matthews - Justice
Pim Lambeau - Oude Dame
Johan Leysen - Ziekenbroeder
Hans Veerman - Huisbaas

External links 
 

1990 films
1990s Dutch-language films
1990s musical films
Dutch musical films